Julius Gotthelf Kühn (23 October 1825 – 14 April 1910) was a German academic and agronomist and he was one of the pioneers of plant pathology. Kuhn's father was a land owner and he gained experience in agriculture and botany on his father's land. He was trained in Bonn, starting at age 30 and was awarded his doctorate, which focused on diseases of beet and canola at Leipzig. In 1862, he became a professor of agriculture at the University of Halle. Kuhn published more than 70 papers on mycology and plant pathology over the course of his career.

One of his seminar papers was the 1858 publication "Die Krankheiten der Kulturgewächse".

He was honoured in 1898, when botanist Paul Wilhelm Magnus circumscribed Kuehneola, which is a genus of rust fungi in the family Phragmidiaceae.

References

1825 births
1910 deaths
Academic staff of the University of Halle
German agronomists
Members of the French Academy of Sciences
Recipients of the Order of Franz Joseph
Recipients of the Order of Saint Stanislaus (Russian)
People from Pulsnitz
People from the Kingdom of Saxony